Arthur Pauli (born 14 May 1989) is an Austrian former ski jumper.

He was a member of the Austrian team that won the Team World Cup at Mühlenkopfschanze, Germany in 2007.

References

External links

Living people
1989 births
Austrian male ski jumpers
People from Reutte District
Sportspeople from Tyrol (state)